The 2018 NWSL Dispersal Draft was held by the National Women's Soccer League on January 30, 2018, after the Boston Breakers ceased operations on January 28, 2018. The draft order is determined using a random weighted draw based on teams' playoffs qualification in the 2017 NWSL season.

Eligible players include Boston's contracted players, 2018 NWSL College Draft selections, players on its Discovery List, and all other players whose NWSL rights were held by Boston. Eligible players who opt out of the draft would not be eligible to play in the 2018 NWSL season.

Contracted players and 2018 draftees, if selected, will not count against a team's roster size limit, salary cap, or international player limit for the 2018 NWSL season. Any players who opted to participate in the draft but were not selected immediately become discovery eligible.

Available players for selection
Announced on January 29, 2018.

Contracted players

2018 draftees

Retired players' rights

Player selections
Conducted on January 30, 2018.

Round 1

Round 2

Round 3

Round 4

Round 5

Trades
Notes
 Sky Blue FC traded the No. 1 overall pick in the dispersal draft to the Washington Spirit in return for the No. 2 overall pick in the dispersal draft and a conditional first-round and natural second pick in the 2019 NWSL College Draft.
 The Orlando Pride traded the No. 8 and No. 11 picks in the dispersal draft to Seattle Reign FC in exchange for Seattle's natural first-round pick in the 2019 NWSL College Draft.

See also
 List of NWSL drafts
 2018 National Women's Soccer League season

References

National Women's Soccer League drafts
2018 National Women's Soccer League season